Armistead is an unincorporated community in Kern County, California. Armistead's ZIP Code is 93527.

References

Unincorporated communities in Kern County, California
Unincorporated communities in California